Aguaje is a Spanish word that may refer to:

Related to water
 Aguaje (geographic locale), a natural water feature or well that provides water for people and livestock
 an ocean current
 a wake
 a fresh water supply

Other uses
 Aguaje Canyon, Colorado, U.S.
 El Aguaje, Durango, Mexico; see Durango state highways
 Mauritia flexuosa, a palm known as aguaje in Peru
 Jesús "Aguaje" Ramos (born 1951), Cuban trombonist

See also